The 2015 USA Pro Cycling Challenge was the fifth edition of the USA Pro Cycling Challenge stage race. Once again, the race was included on the UCI America Tour, with a UCI classification of 2.HC. The race took place between August 17–23, 2015 as a seven-day, seven-stage race, traversing the state of Colorado.

Participating teams

In August, the USA Pro Cycling Challenge announced a sixteen-team field, made up of four UCI WorldTeams, four UCI Professional Continental Teams and eight UCI Continental Teams, thus giving the race a total of sixteen-teams (the same as in 2014).

UCI WorldTeams

  
  
  
 

UCI Professional Continental Teams
 
  
  
 

UCI Continental Teams
 Axeon Cycling Team
 Team Budget Forklifts
 Cycling Academy Team
 Hincapie Racing
 Jamis–Hagens Berman
  
 Optum–Kelly Benefit Strategies

Stages

Classification leadership
In the USA Pro Cycling Challenge, five jerseys are awarded. For the general classification, calculated by adding the finishing times of the stages per cyclist, the leader receives a yellow jersey. This classification is considered the most important of the USA Pro Cycling Challenge, and the winner of the general classification will be considered the winner of the event.

Additionally, there is also a sprints classification, akin to what is called the points classification in other races, which awards a green jersey. Points are gathered at sprint line performances as well as finishing the stage in the top-fifteen places.

There is also a mountains classification, which awards a red jersey. In the mountains classifications, points are won by reaching the top of a mountain before other cyclists. Each climb is categorized, either first, second, third, or fourth category, with more points available for the harder climbs.

There is also a youth classification. This classification is calculated the same way as the general classification, but only young cyclists (under 23) are included. The leader of the young rider classification receives a blue jersey.

The last jersey is awarded to the most aggressive rider of a stage for him to wear on the next stage. It is generally awarded to a rider who attacks constantly or spends a lot of time in the breakaways. This jersey is orange.

There is also a classification for teams. In this classification, the times of the best three cyclists per stage are added, and the team with the lowest time is the leader.

References

External links

USA Pro Cycling Challenge
USA Pro Cycling Challenge
USA Pro Cycling Challenge
USA Pro Cycling